The St. Mary's Academy, also known as St. Mary's High School, is a historic three-story school built in 1909 in Devils Lake, North Dakota, United States.  It was designed by the Hancock Brothers in Classical Revival style.  the building's exterior facade is constructed from buff brick, light mottled Hebron, North Dakota brick, cut granite, and Kettle River sandstone.  The facility operated as a Catholic boarding school from 1909 until the 1950s.  A high school continued to operate in the building until 1979.

References

Neoclassical architecture in North Dakota
School buildings completed in 1909
School buildings on the National Register of Historic Places in North Dakota
National Register of Historic Places in Ramsey County, North Dakota
Schools in Ramsey County, North Dakota
Catholic Church in North Dakota
Educational institutions disestablished in 1979
1909 establishments in North Dakota